Lunghi is a surname. Notable people with the surname include:

Cherie Lunghi (born 1952), British actress
Emilio Lunghi (1886-1925), Italian athlete
Miguel Lunghi (born 1943), Argentine politician
Nathalie Lunghi (born 1986), British actress

See also
Longhi